The 2001 New Zealand rugby union tour was a series of matches played in November–December 2001 in Ireland, Scotland and Argentina by New Zealand national rugby union team. This was iconically former All Blacks captain and most test capped player in history Richie McCaw's debut series for the New Zealand national rugby union team.

Results

'Scores and results list New Zealand's points tally first.

References 
 
 
 

2001 rugby union tours
2001 in New Zealand rugby union
2001
2001
2001–02 in Irish rugby union
2001–02 in Scottish rugby union
2001 in Argentine rugby union
2001
2001
2001